Neighbors (released in some countries as Bad Neighbours) is a 2014 American comedy film directed by Nicholas Stoller and written by Andrew J. Cohen and Brendan O'Brien. The film stars Seth Rogen and Zac Efron with Rose Byrne, Dave Franco and Christopher Mintz-Plasse in supporting roles. The plot follows a couple who come into conflict with a fraternity that has recently moved in next door, which leads them into an all out war.

The film premiered at South by Southwest on March 8, 2014 and was released on May 9 in the United States. The film received positive reviews, with praise aimed at Efron's breakout performance, and was a commercial success, grossing over $270 million worldwide, and became Rogen's highest grossing live-action film. A sequel, Neighbors 2: Sorority Rising, was released on May 20, 2016, with Stoller returned to direct, and much of the cast reprising their roles.

Plot

Mac Radner and his Australian-born wife Kelly are adjusting to life with their infant daughter, Stella. The restrictions of parenthood make it difficult for them to maintain their old lifestyle, which alienates them from their friends Jimmy Blevins and his ex-wife, Paula. Delta Psi Beta, a fraternity known for outrageous parties, moves in next door. The fraternity's leaders, Teddy Sanders and Pete Regazolli, aspire to join Delta Psi's Hall of Fame by throwing a massive end-of-the-year party.

The Radners ask Teddy to keep the noise down, and to earn their favor, he invites them to join the party. Kelly meets Teddy's girlfriend Brooke Shy, and Teddy shows Mac his bedroom, which includes a stash of fireworks and a breaker box that controls the house’s power. Teddy agrees to manage the noise, but has Mac and Kelly promise to always call him instead of the police. The following night, when the party next door keeps Stella awake, Mac is unable to reach Teddy. Kelly convinces Mac to call the police anonymously, but Officer Watkins identifies them to Teddy. Betrayed, Teddy leads Delta Psi in hazing Mac and Kelly, resulting in Stella nearly eating an unused condom after the fraternity dumps their garbage on the Radners’ lawn. Mac and Kelly go to the college dean Carol Gladstone, but the school has a “three strikes” policy before it will intervene; Delta Psi's first strike was burning down their old house.

Failing to force the fraternity to move by damaging their house, Kelly manipulates Pete and Brooke into having sex, and Mac leads Teddy to catch them in the act. Teddy and Pete fight, and a barbecue grill injures a passing professor. This gives Delta Psi their second strike and places them on probation, effectively ending their party plans. Determined to shut down the fraternity, Mac and Kelly enlist the help of Jimmy, who is jealous that Paula is sleeping with Delta Psi member Scoonie. To acquire evidence of Delta Psi's hazing, they hire a pledge nicknamed Assjuice to stand up to Teddy and record him threatening retaliation. When Teddy instead shows him kindness, he reveals that Mac and Kelly hired him and are trying to sabotage the fraternity. A vengeful Teddy violently pranks the Radners and Jimmy with airbags.

They send Teddy a counterfeit letter from Gladstone lifting Delta Psi’s probation. The fraternity prepares for their end-of-the-year party, which Mac, Kelly, and Jimmy widely publicize to ensure it will be out of control. Once the party is in full swing, they notify the police, but Teddy realizes what the Radners have done, and stops the party just as Watkins arrives. Jimmy throws himself from the balcony to distract Teddy, allowing Kelly to sneak into Teddy's bedroom as Mac fights him off. Unable to open the breaker box to restart the party and alert Watkins, Kelly shoots one of the fireworks at his patrol car. Paula convinces Scoonie to turn on the power, reigniting the party, and she reunites with Jimmy. Teddy takes the blame for the party, convincing Pete to flee with the others, and is arrested; the fraternity is shut down.

Four months later, Mac runs into Teddy, who is working as a shirtless greeter at Abercrombie & Fitch. They greet each other warmly and Teddy reveals he is attending night classes to complete his degree. Mac takes off his shirt and jokingly acts as a greeter with Teddy. Later, Mac and Kelly take pictures of Stella in various costumes for a calendar. They get a call from Jimmy and Paula inviting them to attend Burning Man. Mac and Kelly decline, accepting their new roles as parents.

Cast
 Seth Rogen as Mac Radner, Kelly's husband
 Zac Efron as Teddy Sanders, president of Delta Psi Beta
 Rose Byrne as Kelly Radner, Mac's foul-mouthed Australian wife
 Christopher Mintz-Plasse as Scoonie Schofield, a member of Delta Psi Beta
 Dave Franco as Pete Regazolli, vice-president of Delta Psi Beta
 Ike Barinholtz as Jimmy Blevins, Mac and Kelly's friend
 Carla Gallo as Paula Faldt-Blevins, Jimmy's ex-wife
 Jerrod Carmichael as Garfield “Garf” Slade, a member of Delta Psi Beta
 Craig Roberts as Gary "Assjuice", a member of Delta Psi Beta
 Lisa Kudrow as Dean Carol Gladstone
 Hannibal Buress as Officer Watkins
 Halston Sage as Brooke Shy
 Ali Cobrin as Whitney
 Jason Mantzoukas as Dr. Theodorakis
 Brian Huskey as Bill Wazowkowski, Mac's boss
 Liz Cackowski as Wendy, Mac and Kelly's realtor
 Natasha Leggero as herself
Andy Samberg, Akiva Schaffer, Jorma Taccone, Adam DeVine, Blake Anderson, Anders Holm, Kyle Newacheck, and Jake Johnson make cameo appearances as historical members of Delta Psi Beta.

Production
Seth Rogen and Zac Efron became attached to the film before it was pitched to studios. Universal and New Line Cinema put in bids for the film, with Universal eventually securing the rights of the then-untitled project in July 2011, which was written by Andrew J. Cohen and Brendan O'Brien. The script was written shortly after. It was inspired by Cohen and O'Brien's fear of adulthood. In May 2012, Nicholas Stoller was in talks to direct the film. The story was originally about Rogen's character and students in a frat but as it was too similar to Old School, Stoller changed the script so that it would focus on Rogen's character and his wife against the frat students. Producer Evan Goldberg said: "The initial idea was frat war with Zac Efron. Maybe Seth, but definitely Zac Efron." Byrne's role grew from a footnote relegated to the responsibilities of adulthood to a full-on partner-in-crime. Cohen also said: "Initially, our biggest problem with the script was that it was too repetitious, and amping up Kelly’s involvement and bringing her into the war broke everything wide open." Rogen welcomed the change, "to me that made it even better because it became less about me and some guys fucking with a frat. It was much more about me and my wife, which was way more interesting." The cast and crew had two weeks of rehearsals during which they practised improvisation.

Principal photography began in April 2013 and was completed by the end of May 2013 in Los Angeles, United States. Filming lasted 38 days. The two houses used in the film are situated in the West Adams District of Los Angeles.

Cameras and iPhones were distributed to extras, partygoers, and cast members for additional first-person perspective. On August 26, 2013, the film's original title Townies was changed to Neighbors. The film was released as Bad Neighbours outside of the U.S., to prevent confusion with the similarly titled Australian soap opera.

A "work-in-progress" cut of the film was screened on March 8, 2014, at The Paramount Theatre in Austin, Texas during South by Southwest.

Release
Neighbors grossed $150.2 million in North America and $120.5 million in other territories, for a worldwide total of $270.7 million against a budget of $18 million. Calculating in all expenses, Deadline Hollywood estimated that the film made a profit of $136.1 million. It is Rogen's highest grossing non-animated film, surpassing Knocked Up ($219.1 million).

The film grossed $49 million in its opening weekend in North America, finishing the weekend in first place at the box office. The opening total was the third highest United States opening for a non-sequel R-rated comedy behind Sex and the City ($57 million) in 2008 and Ted ($54.4 million) in 2012.

Reception
On Rotten Tomatoes, the film holds an approval rating of 73% based on 224 reviews, with an average rating of 6.4/10. The website's critics consensus reads, "With plenty of bawdy humor evenly spread between its well-matched stars, Neighbors earns its R rating -- and filmgoers' laughs." On Metacritic, the film has a weighted average score of 68 out of 100 based on 45 critics, indicating "generally favorable reviews". Audiences polled by CinemaScore gave the film an average grade of "B" on an A+ to F scale.

Critics praised Efron's performance, and noted that he had successfully shed the "Disney kid" pretty boy stereotype. Critics also praised Byrne's performance and the writers' decision to have her character be a co-conspirator with Rogen's character as opposed to having her on the sidelines.

Accolades

Soundtrack

The soundtrack was released as a digital download in the US on April 29, 2014, and in the UK on May 12, 2014.

Sequel

On February 6, 2015, it was announced that a sequel to Neighbors is in development, entitled Sorority Rising, with Stoller set to return to direct. Once again written by Andrew J. Cohen and Brendan O'Brien, the film follows Mac and Kelly joining forces with Teddy to take on the sorority girls who move into the old frat house. Rogen, Byrne and Efron, as well as Franco, Barinholtz and Gallo, all reprised their roles.  Chloë Grace Moretz, Kiersey Clemons, Beanie Feldstein and Selena Gomez also joined the cast. Principal photography began in mid-2015 and the film was released May 20, 2016.

References

External links

 
 
 
 
 

2010s buddy comedy films
2010s English-language films
2014 comedy films
2014 films
American buddy comedy films
American films about revenge
Films about families
Films about fraternities and sororities
Films directed by Nicholas Stoller
Films produced by Evan Goldberg
Films produced by Seth Rogen
Films scored by Michael Andrews
Films set in Los Angeles
Films shot in Los Angeles
Point Grey Pictures films
Universal Pictures films
2010s American films